There are several people with this name, for others, see Christian Christensen (disambiguation).

Christian Kjeld Kristensen known as Christian "Gentleman Chris" Christensen, (21 May 1926 – 28 January 2005), was a Danish professional middleweight boxer. His heyday was in the late 1950s and early 1960s, when he won the European middleweight title. Professionally, he had a 20.25% knock-out rate, winning 56 of his 79 professional fights. He was born in Kundby, Holbæk, Zealand, Denmark.

Amateur career
Christensen boxed as a welterweight amateur for AK Falcon, and won the Junior Division of the Danish Amateur Boxing Union (Dansk Amatør Bokse-Union) championship (DM) in 1944. In 1946, he won the silver medal at the DM in the Senior Division, when he lost the final bout to Svend Møller. Then he won the Danish championship in the welterweight in 1947 and 1948 .

He participated as a welterweight in the European Cup in 1947, but lost his second match to Charles Humez of France. In 1948, Christensen represented Denmark at the Olympic Games in London.  His first and only match was 7 August 1948 at the Empress Hall, Earls Court Exhibition Centre, Kensington.  He lost that match to Englishman Max B. Shacklady, and thus his chance at a medal. Other than those, Christensen participated in ten amateur boxing matches, and won nine of them. His last amateur fight was a test match against Ulf Olsen of Norway; Christensen won, but was later stripped of his victory because he had signed his first written professional contract just before the fight.

1948 Olympic results
Below is the record of Christian Christensen, a Danish welterweight boxer who competed at the 1948 London Olympics:

 Round of 32: Lost to Max Shacklady (Great Britain) by a third-round knockout

Professional career
Christensen debuted as a professional boxer on 11 February 1949 in Copenhagen, matched against Said Boina. He came away with a victory on points after six rounds. In 1950 he won the Danish professional national championship in the welterweight division on 24 November, in a match against Martin Hansen. In 1952, he won the Danish championship in the middleweight division in a rematch against Martin Hansen. On 24 February 1954, in a match against the Swede Olle Bengtsson in Gothenburg for the Scandinavian middleweight Championship, Christensen was knocked out in the seventh round. In 1954 and 1955 he toured in the United States, where he fought eight matches, winning only three, including defeating former World title challenger Billy Graham, but losing the other five.

But by 1961, Christensen was back in the game, challenging Duilio Loi of Italy for the European Championship in the welterweight division. Duilo Loi won on points over Christensen after 15 rounds. Undeterred, Christensen met Scotsman John "Cowboy" McCormack in K.B. Hallen in Copenhagen on 8 February 1962 for the European middleweight championship. Christensen was knocked down in the fourth round, but began to get up again. Before he could get to his feet and while the referee was still counting, McCormack struck Christensen down again, causing a general uproar, both inside and outside the ring. After the crowd quieted, Christensen was declared the winner on a disqualification. Christensen thus became the third Danish holder of the European championship, Knud Larsen and Jørgen Johansen having come before. Christensen lost the European middleweight championship in his next bout against the Hungarian 3-time Olympic gold medalist László Papp, who won on a technical knockout in the seventh round in Vienna on 16 May 1962.

On 3 February 1963 Christensen was matched against the American Emile Griffith at the Forum in Copenhagen. Griffith was at that time welterweight world champion and according to the Australian Boxing Federation was the world champion in the light-middleweight division as well. Although the match was announced as a world title fight in the light-middleweight division, only Australia recognized it as such, as Griffith was never generally recognized by any major boxing sanctioning organizations as a world Light-Middleweight champion. Griffith was clearly superior, and sent Christensen to the floor in the third round. Christensen took two more rounds before his cornermen throwing in the towelin round five.

During July 1964 at the Forum in Copenhagen, Christensen had a rematch against László Papp for the European Light-Middleweight Championship, but he was knocked out in the fourth round.  In his last match as a professional at the age of 38, Christensen tried once again to regain a European Championship, this time as a Light-Middleweight, but he lost to Italy's Bruno Visintin.  The fight was stopped after eleven rounds with Visintin gaining the victory on points.

Retirement
Christensen published his autobiography, Gentleman Chris, in 1964.

Christensen trained Danish and Norwegian boxers in Oslo and Copenhagen in the 1970s.

References

1926 births
2005 deaths
Welterweight boxers
Lightweight boxers
Olympic boxers of Denmark
Boxers at the 1948 Summer Olympics
European Boxing Union champions
Danish male boxers